Dichlone (trade names Phygon and Quintar) is a fungicide and algicide of the quinone class.  It is a general use fungicide applied to fruits, vegetables, field crops, ornamentals, and residential and commercial outdoor areas.  It is also used to control blue algae.

Dichlone is not persistent in soil and has moderate mammalian toxicity.

Dichlone can be manufactured by the chlorination and oxidation of naphthalene.

References

Algaecides
Fungicides
Naphthoquinones